The Armscor M200 or Rock Island Armory M200 is a double-action revolver made by Armscor in the Philippines. It is chambered for the .38 Special cartridge. The revolver utilizes a transfer bar safety and comes with black, polymer combat grips.

Variants

M206
The M206 variant has a 2-inch barrel. There are also nickle and hammerless variants of the M206

References

External links
 M200/M206 Revolver Manual

.38 Special firearms
Double-action revolvers